The flag of the Lviv Region (translit.: Prapor Lvivs'koi oblasti) is one of regional flags of Ukraine. It is a symbol of the Lviv Oblast that inherits a historical tradition of using regional symbols and is an attribute of the local government and executive powers.

It was officially approved on February 27, 2001, by the decision of the Lviv Oblast Council.

The flag represents a banner of 2:3 proportion. With emblem region in the center — crowned yellow (golden) color lion. Height of lion — 3/4 of the flag's width, the distance from the upper and lower edges of the cloth — 1/8 the width of the flag. In the flip side — a mirror image.

The reference sample flag field is kept in the office of Chairman of the Regional Council.

Meaning 
The lion leaning on a rock symbolizes the power and strength of the land and its inhabitants, who defended their independence from strangers for centuries. At the same time, it resonates with the name of the city of Lviv and the name of its first ruler — Leo I of Galicia.

The crown on the lion's head indicates the capital role of Kingdom of Rus' (Kingdom of Galicia and Volhynia) in the XII—XIV centuries and Kingdom of Galicia and Lodomeria in the XVIII—XX centuries.

Other flags

References

See also

 List of flags of Ukraine

Flags of Ukraine
Lviv Oblast
Flags displaying animals
Flags introduced in 2001